"Gimme Three Steps" is a song by American southern rock band Lynyrd Skynyrd, released from the band's debut album, (Pronounced 'Lĕh-'nérd 'Skin-'nérd) (1973). It was written by bandmates Allen Collins and Ronnie Van Zant.

The single release contains the song "Mr. Banker" as a B-side.

Background
Band member Gary Rossington based the lyrics on a real-life experience Ronnie Van Zant had at a bar in Jacksonville, Florida, having a gun pulled on him for dancing with another man's woman. It narrates how the singer was dancing with a girl named Linda Lou at a bar called The Jug when a man, either the girl's boyfriend or husband, enters with a loaded gun and catches them, angrily believing her to be cheating. The song's title refers to the chorus, where the interloper begs for a head start out of the bar: "Won't you give me three steps / Give me three steps, mister / Give me three steps towards the door? / Give me three steps / Give me three steps, mister / And you'll never see me no more."

Of the live single released in 1977, Cash Box said it is "a traditional rock and roller, featuring some tight harmony vocals and the obligatory high-distortion guitar solo." Record World said that "the triple pronged guitar attack and Ronnie Van Zandt's vocal have never sounded better."

Personnel

Lynyrd Skynyrd 
Ronnie Van Zant - vocals
Gary Rossington - lead guitar
Allen Collins  - guitar
Ed King - bass
Bob Burns - drums
Billy Powell - keyboards

Notes

1973 songs
Lynyrd Skynyrd songs
Song recordings produced by Al Kooper
Songs written by Allen Collins
Songs written by Ronnie Van Zant
Songs based on actual events
1973 singles
MCA Records singles